Scotland's Home of the Year (often abbreviated to SHOTY) is a Scottish reality competition television series. The programme is based on the format of the Norwegian series Årets Hjem, originally created by Nordisk Film TV Denmark and distributed by Banijay. The first series, consisting of seven 30-minute episodes and an hour-long finale, premiered on BBC Scotland on 10 April 2019 as a primetime fixture in the schedule. The programme was renewed for a fourth series, which began filming in June 2021 and is set to air in 2022.

The series follows three property experts, as they travel around Scotland and judge homes based on how well the owners have designed and utilised their available space. One property is selected from each region, and the winner is selected from the homes that reach the finals. Scotland's Home of the Year has received positive reviews from critics and ratings have continued to strengthen throughout its run. The programme was nominated for a Scottish BAFTA in 2020.

Format
Each series of Scotland's Home of the Year features three different homes every week, grouped together based on the region of Scotland they are located in. The houses were grouped into seven distinct regions for the first series, and nine regions from series two onwards. The homes are assessed by the judges, each scoring them out of ten, with marks being awarded for functionality, distinctiveness and style. At the end of the episode, the home with the most points advances to the series finale. Once a home is selected from each region, the finalists are narrowed down to a top 3 in the last episode, before a winner is chosen and awarded a trophy. The series finale every year is recorded in the House for an Art Lover, situated in Bellahouston Park, Glasgow.

The judging panel consists of architect and University of Strathclyde lecturer Michael Angus, interior designer Anna Campbell-Jones, and lifestyle blogger Kate Spiers. In June 2022, winner of the third series of Interior Design Masters Banjo Beale, was announced as the newest member of the judging panel for series five, replacing Spiers who decided to take a break from filming due to pregnancy. Broadcaster Anne McAlpine has served as the narrator in every series.

Series overview

Broadcast history and release
The first series aired between 10 April and 29 May 2019 on BBC Scotland, replacing the docuseries Mini Disco Divas for the Wednesday primetime slot at 8 pm. On 24 June 2019, the show was recommissioned for a second series with two additional episodes. Reruns of the first series aired on BBC One Scotland from 12 July 2019. The second series premiered on 29 April 2020 in the same time slot. Ahead of the series finale on 1 July 2020, the programme was renewed for a third series, which premiered on 7 April 2021. Two weeks later, the BBC confirmed that it had commissioned a fourth series. From the third series onwards, reruns now air on BBC One Scotland on the Monday after their original screening.
Internationally, the series currently airs on the Home Channel, a network based in South Africa that broadcasts across Sub-Saharan Africa via DStv.

Reception

Television ratings
The first series performed moderately, with viewership peaking in the penultimate episode, attracting a combined 100,200 viewers between BBC Scotland and BBC iPlayer. Following the series finale, the show was watched by over 266,000 viewers on BBC iPlayer.

Awards and nominations

References

External links
 Scotland's Home of the Year at BBC Scotland
 

2010s Scottish television series
2010s Scottish television series debuts
2019 British television series debuts
2019 Scottish television series debuts
2020s Scottish television series
BBC reality television shows
BBC Scotland television shows
English-language television shows
Television series by Banijay
Television shows set in Scotland